Paul Anthony Bannon (15 November 1956 – 15 February 2016) was an Irish professional footballer who played most of his career as a centre forward, moving to centre half for his last few years in the League of Ireland. Bannon played in England, Wales, the Netherlands, Greece and Ireland, making over 200 career appearances.

Early life
Bannon was born in Dublin, the son of Tipperary senior inter-county hurler, three-time All-Ireland title winner, Séamus Bannon.

Career

Corby Town
Bannon began his career at Nottingham Forest, scoring consistently for the club's reserve side, but never made a senior appearance for the club. Despite the offer of a trial at Swansea City, in July 1977, Bannon joined Southern Football League side Corby Town, making his debut in the first leg of a cup match, a 1–1 draw with Bedford Town. However, he failed to turn up to the second leg of the match which saw him handed a two-week suspension by the club and he would later be fined a weeks wages later in the season after failing to appear at a league match against Burton Albion. Bannon scored 11 goals in 38 matches for the club but, following a row with manager John Loughlan, was released in April 1978. Loughlan later stated: "On reflection it was probably the best thing I ever did for him [...] He was susceptible to any bad influence in the town and certain so-called friends did not help. They were forever trying to lead him astray". Loughlan would later send Bannon a congratulatory telegram on his return to the Football League in 1979.

Football League
Following his release, Bannon briefly played Gaelic football but soon returned to association football with Welsh club Ammanford Town and his impressive form in the opening months of the 1978–79 season, scoring 16 times by October, saw him join Bridgend Town. He again scored consistently and, in February 1979, he joined Football League Third Division side Carlisle United for a fee of £8,500. He spent four years with the Cumbrians, making his debut in a 2–1 defeat to Bury in February 1979, and won promotion to Division Two with the club during the 1981–82 season. In his final year with Carlisle, he spent a brief period on loan with Darlington in 1983 where he made three league appearances.

In 1983, Bannon joined Bristol Rovers and scored double figures in his first season at Eastville Stadium, including a goal in the team's 1984 Gloucestershire Cup final victory over local rivals Bristol City. The following season, Bannon spent short spells on loan at Cardiff City, making four appearances, and Plymouth Argyle where he made two substitute appearances in November in matches against Wigan Athletic and Walsall without scoring.

Greece

After a period playing for NAC Breda in the Netherlands, PAOK Bannon spent the 1987–88 Alpha Ethniki season with PAOK F.C. He played 20 matches and scored nine league goals, including a hat-trick on 14 February against Levadiakos, which made him the club's joint top scorer. At the end of the season, he moved on to Greek champions Larissa. Their first foray into the European Cup was soon over. In the first round of the 1988–89 European Cup, they were drawn against Neuchâtel Xamax of Switzerland. They overcame the Swiss 2–1 in the first leg, but fell to the same scoreline away. The match went to penalties, and Larissa lost 3–0 with Bannon missing the second kick. Bannon finished the league season with three goals from 11 appearances, and then returned home to Ireland.

Ireland
He made his League of Ireland debut for Cork City on 3 September 1989, the opening day of the 1989–90 season, against Drogheda United. Signed as a centre forward, Bannon went back to centre half because of Cork's injury problems, and he was playing in that position when he scored his first league goal, against Dundalk at Oriel Park on 5 November 1989. Former Cork player and manager Dave Barry included Bannon as a defender in his all-time Cork City eleven, selected in 2004.

Bannon played in Cork's first ever European game, against Torpedo Moscow in the 1989–90 European Cup Winners' Cup. Despite suffering from a virus, he played as the lone striker, and had Cork's only two chances – one header over the bar, one saved – as they lost 5–0 in Moscow. Bannon also played twice against Bayern Munich in the 1991–92 UEFA Cup. Overall, he made four appearances for Cork in Europe.

Bannon scored the only goal of the semi-final, against St Patrick's Athletic, to put Cork through to the 1992 FAI Cup Final. They lost 1–0 to Bohemians. In his last game for Cork, he scored the winning goal to win the 1992–93 League of Ireland Premier Division title at the RDS Arena.

He finished his playing career with Cobh Ramblers, and then assisted Mick Conroy with the running of a youth academy in Cork. Successful graduates include Ireland internationals Colin Healy, Damien Delaney and Liam Miller.

After spending 17 years working for the FAI, he died on 15 February 2016.

Honours
Bristol Rovers
 Gloucestershire Cup winner: 1984

Cork City
 League of Ireland Premier Division winner: 1992–93

References

Sources
Irish Football Handbook by Dave Galvin & Gerry Desmond

1956 births
2016 deaths
Association footballers from Dublin (city)
Republic of Ireland association footballers
Association football forwards
Association football defenders
Nottingham Forest F.C. players
Corby Town F.C. players
Carlisle United F.C. players
Darlington F.C. players
Bristol Rovers F.C. players
Cardiff City F.C. players
Plymouth Argyle F.C. players
NAC Breda players
PAOK FC players
Athlitiki Enosi Larissa F.C. players
Cork City F.C. players
Cobh Ramblers F.C. players
English Football League players
Eerste Divisie players
Super League Greece players
League of Ireland players
Republic of Ireland expatriate association footballers
Irish expatriate sportspeople in Greece
Irish expatriate sportspeople in the Netherlands
Irish expatriate sportspeople in England
Irish expatriate sportspeople in Wales
Expatriate footballers in England
Expatriate footballers in the Netherlands
Expatriate footballers in Greece
Ammanford A.F.C. players